Titan Magazines is the magazine-publishing division of Titan Publishing Group. Titan Magazines' publishing directors are Ricky Claydon and John Dziewiatkowski.

History

Titan Magazines launched in 1995 with Star Trek Magazine with John Freeman as first editor, although it had previously published several one shot film tie-in titles. Since then it has published many film, TV and comics titles, including poster magazines for Tim Burton's Batman.

Some of Titan's magazines are published in the US, although not all, some with an entirely separate magazine.

In April 2016, Bleeding Cool published a blog/vlog entry pertaining to concerns over Titan's UK reprints of DC titles, specifically cancellations and a lack of updates and communication with readers, as well as addressing the frequent inconsistencies regarding the publication dates of future issues. 
Despite numerous complaints, some of Titan's DC titles continue to be plagued with errors. DC Universe #3.9 (featuring Justice League) appeared on shelves on 9 May 2018, with the next issue being erroneously advertised as coming out as early as 10 May 2018.

Titan ceased publication of all their DC Comics titles in December 2018, most notably ending a fifteen-year run for 'Batman Legends'.

Titles

DC Comics titles

Batman Legends (late retitled 'Batman')
DC Universe Presents (previously titled 'Superman Legends' and later used the cover titles 'Justice League' and 'Justice League Trinity')ArrowBatman: Arkham (replaced with Batman: Gotham Central)Batman/Superman'
Batman: The Brave and the Bold (comics)
Batman: The Dark Knight (replaced with Batman: Arkham)
Batman: Gotham Central
DC Super Friends 
DC Universe Presents Batman Superman
The Flash
Justice League Legends
Superman (replaced with Batman/Superman)
Green Arrow (2 issues, 2016)
DC Comics Showcase: Supergirl (3 issues, 2016)
DC Comics Showcase: Harley Quinn
DC Legends: Suicide Squad
DC Legends: Wonder Woman

Other comics

Current:

Adventure Time
Blade Runner
Doctor Who Comic
Doctor Who: Tales from the TARDIS
Rick and Morty
Simpsons Comics
Man: Plus 
Minions Comic
Tank Girl (digital only)

Cancelled:

CLiNT
Completely... (different theme each issue)
Futurama Comics (2002–2013, 67 issues)
Gogo's Crazy Bones Comic
Indiana Jones Comic (2007)
The Real Adventures of Jonny Quest (1996-1997, 6 issues)
Torchwood Comic
Teenage Mutant Ninja Turtles Comic
Terminator Salvation Comic (2009, 4 Issues)
Totally... (different theme each issue)
Transformers Comic UK (2007–2014, 5 volumes)
Transformers Animated (2009, 3 Issues)
The Troop (2015–2016, 5 issues)
Shaun the Sheep Comic  
SpongeBob SquarePants Comic
Star Wars (UK comics) (1999-2014, 7 volumes)
Star Wars Galaxy (2010-2012, 24 issues)
Wallace and Gromit Comic 
WWE Heroes Comic

Magazines

Current:

Star Trek Explorer (Nov 2021–)(relaunch of Star Trek Magazine)
Star Wars Insider
Souvenir One Shots (different theme each issue, usually TV show tie-ins)

Past:
24
Alias
Angel Magazine
The Official Babylon 5 Magazine
Battlestar Galactica
Buffy the Vampire Slayer Magazine
Charmed Magazine
CSI Magazine
Dreamwatch (General Sci-Fi Entertainment Title)
Farscape Magazine (12 issues, April/May 2001 – April/May 2003)
Heroes Magazine
Indiana Jones Magazine
Lost: The Official Magazine
Manga Max (formerly Manga Mania)
Monster High Magazine
Prison Break Magazine
RAF Magazine
Smallville Magazine
Space: Above and Beyond Magazine (4 Issues; 1997)
Star Trek Magazine (relaunched as Star Trek Explorer)
Stargate Magazine
Supernatural Magazine (Contract expired, may or may not be continuing publishing)
Torchwood Magazine
Xena Magazine
The X-Files
The Walking Dead Magazine

References

External links

 Titan Magazines US official site
 Titan Magazines UK official site
 Titan Books official site
 Titan Magazines official YouTube channel

 
Mass media companies based in London
1995 establishments in the United Kingdom
Publishing companies established in 1995